P. orientalis may refer to:
 Paradelma orientalis, the Brigalow scaly-foot or Queensland snake-lizard, a lizard species endemic to Australia
 Phalanger orientalis, the northern common cuscus, a marsupial species native to northern New Guinea
 Phylloscopus orientalis, the Eastern Bonelli's warbler, a bird species
 Picea orientalis, the Caucasian spruce or Oriental spruce, a tree species native to the Caucasus and adjacent northeast Turkey
 Platanus orientalis, the Oriental plane, a large deciduous tree species native from the Balkans to as far east as at least Iran
 Platycladus orientalis, an evergreen coniferous tree species native to northwestern China
 Platysaurus orientalis, the Sekukhune flat lizard, a reptile species found in Africa
 Plectorhinchus orientalis, a grunt species from the Indo-Pacific
 Poecilmitis orientalis, a butterfly species endemic to South Africa
 Polybranchia orientalis, a sea slug species found in the Indian and Pacific Oceans
 Pseudanthus orientalis, a plant species in the genus Pseudanthus endemic to Australia
 Pseudomonas orientalis, a Gram-negative rod-shaped bacterium isolated from spring waters in Lebanon
 Pterocles orientalis, the black-bellied sandgrouse, a medium large bird species found in Iberia, northwest Africa, the Canary Islands, Turkey, Iran, Cyprus and Israel

Synonyms
 Psalidoprocne orientalis, a synonym for Psalidoprocne pristoptera, the black saw-wing or black rough-winged swallow, a small passerine bird species
 Pyralis orientalis, a synonym for Pyralis farinalis, the meal moth, a cosmopolitan moth species

See also
 Orientalis (disambiguation)